Major General Rajinder Singh, MVC & bar (3 October 1911 – May 1994) was an Indian Army officer and a two time member of the Lok Sabha, the lower house of the Indian parliament. He was nicknamed 'Sparrow'.

Career
Singh served in the ranks of the British Indian Army from 3 October 1932 to 31 January 1938. He attended the Indian Military Academy, Dehra Dun, and was commissioned onto the Unattached List, Indian Army on 1 February 1938. He spent the next year attached to The King's Regiment (Liverpool), a British Army regiment, stationed on the North West Frontier. He was then admitted to the Indian Army and joined the 7th Light Cavalry on 24 February 1939. He was promoted to lieutenant on 30 April 1939, and served during World War II. He was promoted temporary captain and acting major on 16 April 1942, to war-substantive captain and temporary major on 9 January 1943 and to substantive captain on 31 January 1945.

Singh opted to join the Indian Army upon the partition of India in 1947, and commanded the 7th Light Cavalry from September 1947 to May 1949. He was twice awarded the Maha Vir Chakra, the second highest military decoration in India, the first for his role during the Indo-Pakistani War of 1947, for outstanding leadership during the advance and capture of Jhangar (Operation Bison), and the second for displaying gallantry in the Indo-Pakistani War of 1965, during which he was GOC of the 1st Armoured Division.

Promoted to colonel on 30 January 1957, Singh held the appointment of regimental colonel of the 7th Light Cavalry from July 1959 to July 1969. He was appointed D. A.C., Army HQ. On 3 July 1961, he was appointed a G.O.C. commanding a division, with the acting rank of major-general.

Singh retired from the Army on 26 September 1966.  After retirement he entered politics and became a minister in the short lived Gurnam Singh ministry in 1967. Later he was elected to the Lok Sabha in 1980 and 1985 for the Jalandhar constituency as a candidate of the Indian National Congress. He died in May 1994, at the age of 83.

Dates of rank

Notes

Vicky

External links
 
 

1911 births
1994 deaths
Indian generals
Recipients of the Maha Vir Chakra
People from Jalandhar district
Lok Sabha members from Punjab, India
India MPs 1980–1984
India MPs 1984–1989
Military personnel of the Indo-Pakistani War of 1965
People of the Indo-Pakistani War of 1947
State cabinet ministers of Punjab, India
Indian Army personnel of World War II
British Indian Army officers
Indian National Congress politicians